The 1987–88 Eintracht Frankfurt season was the 88th season in the club's football history. In 1987–88 the club played in the Bundesliga, the top tier of German football. It was the club's 25th season in the Bundesliga.

The season ended up with Eintracht winning the DFB-Pokal for the fourth time.

Matches

Legend

Friendlies

Bundesliga

League fixtures and results

League table

DFB-Pokal

Final

Squad

Squad and statistics

|}

Notes

References

Sources

External links
 Official English Eintracht website 
 German archive site
 1987–88 Bundesliga season at Fussballdaten.de 

1987-88
German football clubs 1987–88 season